Seaoil Philippines, Inc., stylized as SEAOIL Philippines, is a fuel company that started in 1978. The Filipino-owned company offers fuel products ranging from automobile gasoline to industry-specific lubricants and services such as storage and shipping.

History
Seaoil Philippines was founded in 1978 by Francis Yu where it was engaged in offering storage facilities for petroleum and petrochemical based products. A few years later, it expanded its operations by creating a niche in the wholesale petroleum market. In 1988, the company partnered with Paramins to develop lubricants. In anticipation of the oil market deregulation in 1996, Seaoil Philippines was established, becoming the first independent fuel company to open a retail station. From one station opened in 1997, Seaoil now has over 300 stations, making it the 5th independent fuel company in the Philippines.

In December 2017, SEAOIL entered a strategic partnership with Caltex Australia (now Ampol). As part of the partnership, Caltex Australia would supply oil to SEAOIL via its fuel trading and shipping business, Ampol Singapore, while Caltex Australia would take up a 20% equity interest in SEAOIL. Caltex Australia's acquisition of the 20% equity interest was completed in March 2018.

Products 
Seaoil gasoline products are compliant with the Biofuels Act of 2006, which mandates the blending of 1 percent CME (coco-methyl ester) for all diesels in May 2007 (upgraded to 2 percent in 2009), and blending of 10 percent ethanol into gasoline and other product lines in 2009.

Fuel  
 Extreme 97
 Extreme 95
 Extreme U
 Exceed Diesel
 E85 (Available at the Pasig Boulevard Station)

V.I.P. Card 

The Seaoil V.I.P. (Values, Incentives and Privileges) Club is a loyalty program that gives rewards and incentives to its members through point-per-purchase system.

Seaoil Price Lock Fuel Prepaid Card 
The Price Lock Fuel Prepaid Card was introduced by the company to address the uncontrollable weekly price increases of oil products in mid-2008. It allowed consumers to buy unleaded gasoline and for a fixed price. Due to the positive response of the market, the promo validity of the card was extended.
In 2011, Price Lock cards were sold again due to the weekly oil price increase in the market.

See also
 List of gas station chains in the Philippines

References

Oil and gas companies of the Philippines
Automotive fuel retailers
Retail companies established in 1978
Companies based in Pasig
Non-renewable resource companies established in 1978
Philippine companies established in 1978
Gas stations in the Philippines